Bad Chili is a 1997 crime mystery novel by American author Joe R. Lansdale. It is the fourth in the series of books featuring Lansdale's longtime protagonists Hap and Leonard. The two characters couldn't be more different; Hap is a white working class laborer who went to prison to protest the Vietnam war, and Leonard is a gay, black, Vietnam vet with serious anger issues. Both are experts in the martial arts and are the best of friends.

Plot summary
Hap returns from his off-shore oil platform job to discover that his best friend Leonard is being framed for a series of murders. The first of these is a biker who stole Leonard's boyfriend, and the second is Leonard's ex-boyfriend himself. The two of them set out to find who the real killers are and clear Leonard's name.

Editions
This book was first published by the now defunct Mojo Press with only 500 signed copies. It was then published as a mass-market trade hardcover by Mysterious Press. It was re-issued as a trade paperback in May 2009 by Vintage Crime/Black Lizard books.

References

External links
Author's Official Website
Paperback Publisher's website
Author's Publisher Website

Novels by Joe R. Lansdale
American crime novels
1997 American novels
Novels set in Texas
Works by Joe R. Lansdale